Holtikoti is a village in Dharwad district of Karnataka, India.

Demographics 
As of the 2011 Census of India there were 356 households in Holtikoti and a total population of 1,786 consisting of 929 males and 857 females. There were 308 children ages 0-6.

References

Villages in Dharwad district